A Most Immoral Lady is a 1929 American drama film directed by John Griffith Wray and written by Forrest Halsey. It is based on the 1928 play A Most Immoral Lady by Townsend Martin. The film stars Leatrice Joy, Walter Pidgeon, Sidney Blackmer, Montagu Love, Josephine Dunn and Robert Edeson. The film was released by Warner Bros. on September 22, 1929.

Cast       
Leatrice Joy as Laura Sergeant
Walter Pidgeon as Tony Williams
Sidney Blackmer as Humphrey Sergeant
Montagu Love as John Williams
Josephine Dunn as Joan Porter
Robert Edeson as Bradford-Fish
Donald Reed as Pedro the Gigolo
Florence Oakley as Natalie Davis
Wilson Benge as Hoskins

References

External links
 

1929 films
1920s English-language films
1929 drama films
First National Pictures films
Warner Bros. films
Films directed by John Griffith Wray
American black-and-white films
1920s American films